Rajaram Ozare (15 September 1975) is an Indian politician and member of the 12th state Maharashtra Legislative Assembly. He represented the Dahanu constituency as member of Communist Party of India (Marxist).

References 

1975 births
Living people
Maharashtra MLAs 2009–2014
Communist Party of India (Marxist) politicians from Maharashtra
Marathi politicians